John Knox Wilkinson (born 1955) is an American politician who served as a Republican member of the Georgia State Senate from 2011 to 2021. He was elected in a special election in 2011, and sworn in on December 15, 2011. Wilkinson is a teacher/farmer and attended the University of Georgia. He was born in Toccoa, Georgia.

References

1955 births
Living people
Republican Party Georgia (U.S. state) state senators
People from Toccoa, Georgia
University of Georgia alumni
Candidates in the 2020 United States elections
21st-century American politicians